Hello Nasty is the fifth studio album by American rap rock group Beastie Boys, released by Capitol Records and Grand Royal Records on July 14, 1998. It sold 681,000 copies in its first week, debuting at number 1 on the Billboard 200 album sales chart, and won Best Alternative Music Album and Best Rap Performance by a Duo or Group (for "Intergalactic") at the 41st Annual Grammy Awards. In Beastie Boys Book (2018), Ad-Rock said he felt Hello Nasty was the group's "best record".

Background
The album was released on July 14, 1998, just over four years after the previous Beastie Boys album, Ill Communication. It marked the addition of DMC champion Mix Master Mike to the group's line-up, and was the last time the band worked with percussionist Eric Bobo or a co-producer. There are several guest vocalists on the album, including Miho Hatori of Cibo Matto on "I Don't Know", and Jamaican dub musician Lee "Scratch" Perry on "Dr. Lee, PhD".

The title of the album was allegedly inspired by the receptionist of the band's NY-based publicity firm Nasty Little Man, who would answer the phone with the greeting "Hello, Nasty." In addition, the title is mentioned in the song "Putting Shame in Your Game". The cover art depicts the three Beastie Boys (Horovitz, Yauch, and Diamond, from left to right) stuffed in an aluminum sardine tin and getting baked in the sun. The band references this image in the song "Body Movin'", with the lyrics: "MCA, where have you been?/Packed like sardines in a tin."

There were CD, double-vinyl LP, MiniDisc, and cassette tape releases of the album. One of the cassette formats was packaged for a limited run by BioBox in a small cardboard box, rather than a clear plastic case, in an attempt to distinguish the retail product and augment sales.

Critical reception

Hello Nasty received mostly positive reviews upon its release. Caroline Sullivan, writing for The Guardian, named it the "Pop CD of the Week" and said it "fills a gap created by the current profusion of serious rock bands like Radiohead; elbowing its way up front, [and letting] rip with adolescent vigour." She went on to summarize the record as "the perfect party soundtrack by the perfect party band." Selects John Harris praised the Beastie Boys' lyrics for being as "fantastically off-beam as ever", while at the same time noting that they had "broadened their musical vistas yet further". Although AllMusic's Stephen Thomas Erlewine felt the album's ending was "a little anticlimactic", he also saw Hello Nasty as a progressive step forward from the group's 1992 LP Check Your Head and praised the contributions of the group's new recruit, Mix Master Mike: "Hiring DJ Mixmaster Mike turned out to be a masterstroke; he and the Beasties created a sound that strongly recalls the spare electronic funk of the early '80s, but spiked with the samples and post-modern absurdist wit that have become their trademarks." In his review for Entertainment Weekly, David Browne highlighted the album's multi-genre sound as its most engaging aspect:

Hello Nasty is a sonic smorgasbord in which the Beasties gorge themselves with reckless abandon. They dabble in lounge-pop kitsch (the loser put-down "Song for the Man"), make like a summit of Santana and Traffic (the Latin-flavored "Song for Junior"), and subtly incorporate a drum-and-bass shuffle into the mix ("Flowin' Prose"). The melange makes for a looser, more free-spirited record than their earlier albums; the music invites you in, rather than threatening to shut you out.

Accolades

Track listing

Personnel
Adapted from the AllMusic credits.

Beastie Boys – producers
Mario Caldato, Jr. – producer
Mix Master Mike – DJ (8, 9, 12, 13, 19)
"Money" Mark Nishita – keyboards (4, 14, 20, 21)
Eric Bobo – percussion (3, 8, 14, 21)
Brooke Williams – vocals (4, 18)
Nelson Keane Carse – trombone (4)
Paul Vercesi – alto sax (4)
Biz Markie – vocals (7, 12, 13)
Jill Cunniff – vocals (14)
Joe Locke – vibraphone (14)
Steve Slagle – flute (14)
Miho Hatori – vocals (15)
Duduka Da Fonseca – percussion (15)
Richard Siegler – percussion (15)
Jane Scarpantoni – cello (15)
Brian Wright – violin, viola (15)
Lee "Scratch" Perry – vocals (21)
Pat Shannahan – sample clearance
Steve Revitte – engineering
Suzanne Dyer – engineering
Andy VanDette – mastering
Howie Weinberg – mastering
Michael Lavine – photography
Cey Adams – art direction
Bill McMullen – design

Charts

Weekly charts

Year-end charts

Certifications

References

External links
 

1998 albums
Beastie Boys albums
Capitol Records albums
Grammy Award for Best Alternative Music Album
Albums produced by Mario Caldato Jr.